Leptospermum variabile is a species of shrub that is endemic to eastern Australia. It has thin, rough or scaly bark, broadly elliptical to lance-shaped leaves with the narrower end towards the base, white flowers arranged singly on the ends of short side branches, and woody fruit that remains on the plant when mature.

Description
It has thin, rough or scaly bark and the younger stems are covered with soft hairs at first.

Taxonomy and naming
Leptospermum variabile was formally described in 1989 by Joy Thompson in the journal Telopea from specimens collected by P.R. Sharp near Rathdowney in 1978. The specific epithet (variabile) refers to the variability of this species, especially of the width of the leaves and the size of the fruit.

Distribution and habitat
Leptospermum variabile grows in crevices between rocks on rocky summits or ridges on the tablelands and coastal ranges from south east Queensland to near Taree in New South Wales.

References

variabile
Myrtales of Australia
Flora of New South Wales
Flora of Queensland
Plants described in 1989
Taxa named by Joy Thompson